Horokhiv (Arkhev) is a town in Volyn Oblast, Ukraine. It serves as the administrative center of Horokhiv Raion. Population:

History
The first written mention of it was in 1240 in the Hypatian Codex.

From 1795 until the Russian Revolution of 1917, it was part of Volhynian Governorate of the Russian Empire; from 1921 to 1939 it was part of Wołyń Voivodeship of Poland.

A railway station was built here in 1924-1925.

Since September 1939 it was a part of the USSR. Also, in 1939 it became a town.

A local newspaper is published here since 1939.

The Germans occupied town from summer 1941 to July 1944. Its Jewish population, comprising over half the town’s inhabitants, was murdered en masse during The Holocaust.

Gallery

References

External links
 

Cities in Volyn Oblast
Volhynian Governorate
Wołyń Voivodeship (1921–1939)
Cities of district significance in Ukraine
Jewish Ukrainian history
Holocaust locations in Ukraine